This list of wine-producing regions catalogues significant growing regions where vineyards are planted. Wine grapes mostly grow between the 30th and the 50th degree of latitude, in both the Northern and Southern hemispheres. Grapes will sometimes grow beyond this range, thus minor amounts of wine are made in some rather unexpected places.

In 2014, the five largest producers of wine in the world were, in order, Italy, Spain, France, the United States, and China.

Countries
The following is a list of the top wine-producing countries and their volume of wine production for the year 2014 in tonnes, according to the Food and Agriculture Organization (FAO), which is an agency of the United Nations; this is the latest information available from the FAO.

Their data show a total worldwide production of 31 million tonnes of wine with the top 15 producing countries accounting for over 90% of the total.

Africa

Algeria 

 Algiers
 Béjaïa
 Chlef Province
 Dahra
 Mascara
 Médéa
 Tlemcen
 Zaccar

Cape Verde 
 Chã das Caldeiras

Morocco 
 Atlas Mountains
 Benslimane
 Meknès

South Africa 

 Breede River Valley
 Constantia
 Durbanville
 Elgin
 Elim
 Franschhoek
 Little Karoo
 Orange River Valley
 Paarl
 Robertson
 Stellenbosch
 Swartland
 Tulbagh

Tunisia 
 Arianah
 Nabul
 Sousse

Americas

Argentina 

 Buenos Aires Province
 Médanos
 Catamarca Province
 La Rioja Province
 Mendoza Province
 Neuquén Province
 Río Negro Province
 Salta Province
 San Juan Province

Bolivia 
 Tarija Department

Brazil 

 Bahia
 Curaçá
 Irecê
 Juazeiro
 Mato Grosso
 Nova Mutum
 Minas Gerais
 Andradas
 Caldas
 Pirapora
 Santa Rita de Caldas
 Paraná
 Bandeirantes
 Marialva
 Maringá
 Rosário do Avaí
 Pernambuco
 Casa Nova
 Petrolina
 Santa Maria da Boa Vista
 Rio Grande do Sul
 Bento Gonçalves
 Caxias do Sul
 Cotiporã
 Farroupilha
 Flores da Cunha
 Garibaldi
 Pinto Bandeira
 Santa Catarina
 Pinheiro Preto
 São Joaquim
 Tangará
 São Paulo
 Jundiaí
 São Roque

Canada 

 British Columbia
 Fraser Valley (VQA defined viticultural area)
 Gulf Islands (VQA defined viticultural area)
 Okanagan Valley  (VQA defined viticultural area)
 Similkameen Valley  (VQA defined viticultural area)
 Thompson Valley (wine region) (VQA defined viticultural area)
 Vancouver Island (VQA defined viticultural area)
 Nova Scotia
 Annapolis Valley
 Ontario
 Lake Erie North Shore and Pelee Island (VQA defined viticultural area)
 Niagara Peninsula (VQA defined viticultural area)
 Prince Edward County (VQA defined viticultural area)
 Toronto
 Quebec
 Eastern Townships

Colombia 

 Villa de Leyva
 Valle del Cauca 
 La Unión

Chile 

 Aconcagua
 Aconcagua Valley
 Casablanca Valley
 Atacama
 Copiapó Valley
 Huasco Valley
 Central Valley
 Cachapoal Valley
 Maipo Valley
 Mataquito Valley
 Maule Valley
 Coquimbo
 Choapa Valley
 Elqui Valley
 Limarí
 Pica – a wine-producing oasis before the Chilenization of Tarapacá
 Southern Chile
 Bío-Bío Valley
 Itata Valley
 Malleco Valley
 Bueno Valley and Ranco Lake

Mexico 

 Aguascalientes
 Aguascalientes Valley
 Baja California
 Valle de Guadalupe
 Valle de Calafia
 Valle de Mexicali
 Valle de San Vicente
 Valle de Santo Tomás
 Zona Tecate
 Coahuila / Durango, collectively known as La Laguna wine region
 Valle de Parras
 Guanajuato
 Guanajuato City
 San Miguel de Allende
 Dolores Hidalgo
 San Felipe
 Salvatierra
 San Francisco del Rincón
 Hidalgo
 Nuevo León
 Valle de Las Maravillas
 Querétaro
 Valle de Tequisquiapan
 Sonora
 Caborca
 Hermosillo
 Zacatecas
 Valle de las Arcinas

Peru 

 Arequipa region valleys
 Huaral District and Cañete Province – both in Lima Region; formerly in Surco were vineyards that have disappeared due to urban expansion
 Ica Region – including Chincha, Pisco and Ica valleys
 Pica – a wine-producing oasis before the Chilenization of Tarapacá

United States 

 Arizona
 California
Central Coast AVA
Livermore Valley AVA
Paso Robles AVA
York Mountain AVA
Central Valley
Lodi AVA
North Coast AVA
Mendocino AVA
Napa Valley AVA
Sonoma County
Sierra Foothills AVA
South Coast AVA
 Colorado
 Idaho
 Michigan
 Missouri
 New Jersey
 New Mexico
 New York
Finger Lakes AVA
Hudson River Region AVA
Long Island AVA
 Ohio
 Oregon
 Willamette Valley AVA
 Pennsylvania
 Texas
Texas High Plains AVA
Texas Hill Country AVA
Trans-Pecos
 Virginia
 Washington
 Columbia Valley AVA

Uruguay 

 Montevideo
 Canelones
 Maldonado
 Garzón
 José Ignacio
 Colonia
 San José

Venezuela 
The wine-producing enterprise for Venezuela can be found  here.
 Carora, Lara State

Europe

Albania 

 Berat
 Korça
 Leskovik
 Lezhë
 Përmet
 Shkoder
 Tirana County

Austria 

 Burgenland
 Northeastern and eastern Lower Austria
 Kamptal
 Kremstal
 Wachau
 Wagram
 Weinviertel
 Southern Styria
 Vienna and surrounding area

Belgium 

 Côtes de Sambre et Meuse, between the rivers Sambre et Meuse, since 2004
 Hagelandse wijn, near Rotselaar/Leuven, since 1997
 Haspengouw, Limburg, since 2000
 Heuvelland, since 2005

Bosnia and Herzegovina 
 Čapljina
 Čitluk
 Ljubuški
 Međugorje
 Mostar
 Stolac
 Trebinje

Bulgaria 

 Black Sea region
 Danubian Plain
 Rose Valley
 Thrace
 Valley of the Struma River

Croatia 

 Continental Croatia: Central Croatia and Slavonia
 Moslavina
 Plešivica
 Podunavlje
 Pokuplje
 Prigorje – Bilogora
 Slavonia
 Zagorje – Međimurje
 Littoral Croatia: Northern Croatian Littoral and Dalmatia
 Croatian Coast (Hrvatsko primorje)
 Dalmatian Interior (Dalmatinska zagora)
 Central and South Dalmatia (Srednja i Južna Dalmacija)
 Northern Dalmatia (Sjeverna Dalmacija)
 Istria (Istra)

Cyprus 

 Commandaria
 Laona – Akamas
 Vouni Panagias – Ambelitis
 Krasochoria Lemesou
 Pitsilia
 Diarizos Valley

Czech Republic 

 Moravia
 Mikulov – Mikulovska wine
 Slovácko
 Velké Pavlovice
 Znojmo
 Bohemia
 Litoměřice
 Mělník
 Prague
 Gazebo at Gröbe’s Villa
 St. Clare’s
 St. Wenceslas’ Vineyard at Prague castle
 Salabka, Troja

Denmark

France 

 Alsace – Alsace wine
 Bordeaux – Bordeaux wine
 Barsac
 Entre-Deux-Mers
 Fronsac
 Graves
 Haut-Médoc
 Margaux
 Médoc
 Pauillac
 Pessac-Léognan
 Pomerol
 Saint-Émilion
 Saint-Estèphe
 Saint-Julien
 Sauternes – Sauternes
 Burgundy (Bourgogne) – Burgundy wine
 Beaujolais
 Bugey
 Chablis
 Côte Chalonnaise
 Côte d'Or
 Côte de Beaune
 Aloxe-Corton
 Auxey-Duresses
 Beaune
 Chassagne-Montrachet
 Meursault
 Santenay
 Côte de Nuits
 Chambolle-Musigny
 Gevrey-Chambertin
 Nuits-Saint-Georges
 Vosne-Romanée
 Mâconnais
 Pouilly-Fuissé
 Champagne – Champagne
Corsica
Ajaccio
Cap Course
Patrimonio
Vin de Corse
Calvi
Figari
Porto-Vecchio
Sartène 
 Jura – Jura wine
 Languedoc-Roussillon
 Banyuls
 Blanquette de Limoux
 Cabardès
 Collioure
 Corbières
 Côtes du Roussillon
 Fitou
 Maury
 Minervois
 Rivesaltes
 Loire Valley – Loire Valley (wine region)
 Anjou – Saumur
 Cognac
 Muscadet
 Pouilly-Fumé
 Sancerre
 Touraine
 Lorraine
 Madiran
 Provence
 Rhône – Rhône wine
 Beaumes-de-Venise
 Château-Grillet
 Châteauneuf-du-Pape
 Condrieu
 Cornas
 Côte du Rhône-Villages, Rhône wine
 Côte-Rôtie
 Côtes du Rhône
 Crozes-Hermitage
 Gigondas
 Hermitage
 St. Joseph
 Saint-Péray
 Vacqueyras
 Savoy

Georgia 

 Abkhazia
 Kakheti, containing the micro-regions Telavi and Kvareli
 Kartli
 Imereti
 Racha-Lechkhumi and Kvemo Svaneti

Germany 

 Ahr
 Baden
 Franconia (Franken)
 Hessische Bergstraße
 Mittelrhein
 Mosel
 Nahe
 Palatinate (Pfalz)
 Rheingau
 Rheinhessen
 Saale-Unstrut
 Saxony (Sachsen)
 Württemberg

Greece 

 Aegean islands
 Crete
 Limnos
 Paros
 Rhodes
 Samos
 Santorini
 Central Greece
 Attica
 Epirus
 Zitsa
 Thessaly
 Nea Anchialos
 Rapsani
 Ionian Islands
 Kefalonia
 Macedonia
 Amyntaion
 Goumenissa
 Naousa, Imathia
 Peloponnesus
 Mantineia
 Nemea
 Patras

Hungary 

 Balaton
 Badacsony
 Balaton-felvidék
 Balatonboglár
 Balatonfüred-Csopak
 Nagy-Somló
 Zala
 Duna
 Csongrád
 Hajós-Baja
 Kunság
 Eger
 Bükk
 Eger
 Észak-Dunántúl
 Etyek-Buda
 Mátra
 Mór
 Neszmély
 Pannonhalma
 Pannon
 Pécs
 Szekszárd
 Tolna
 Villány
 Sopron
 Tokaj

Ireland 
 Cork

Italy 

 Apulia
 Bianco di Locorotondo e Martina Franca
 Primitivo di Manduria
 Calabria
 Bivongi
 Cirò
 Gaglioppo
 Greco di Bianco
 Lamezia
 Melissa
 Sant'Anna di Isola Capo Rizzuto
 Savuto
 Scavigna
 Terre di Cosenza
Campania
Avellino
Aglianico
Falanghina
Fiano
Greco di Tufo
Benevento
Aglianico
Falanghina
Solopaca
Caserta
Napoli
Salerno
 Emilia-Romagna
 Colli Cesenate
 Sangiovese Superiore di Romagna
 Trebbiano di Romagna
 Liguria
 Cinque Terre
 Lombardy
 Franciacorta
 Oltrepo Pavese
 Marche
 Castelli di Jesi
 Conero
 Piceno
 Piedmont
 Acqui
 Alba
 Asti
 Barolo
 Colli Tortonesi
 Gattinara
 Gavi
 Ghemme
 Langhe
 Monferrato
 Nizza
 Ovada
 Sardinia
 Cagliari
 Cannonau
 Monti
 Nuragus
 Ogliastra
 Vermentino di Gallura
 Sicily
 Etna
 Noto
 Pantelleria
 Trentino-Alto Adige
 South Tyrol, known alternatively as Südtirol (in German) or Alto Adige (in Italian)
 Trentino
 Tuscany
 Bolgheri
 Chianti
 Chianti Classico
 Colli Apuani
 Colli Etruria Centrale
 Colline Lucchesi
 Elba
 Montalcino
 Montescudaio
 Parrina
 Pitigliano
 San Gimignano
 Scansano
 Val di Chiana
 Val di Cornia
 Valdinievole
 Valle di Arbia
 Umbria
 Montefalco
 Orvieto
 Torgiano
 Veneto
 Arcole
 Bagnoli
 Bardolino
 Bianco di Custoza
 Breganze
 Colli Berici
 Colli di Conegliano
 Colli Euganei
 Gambellara
 Garda
 Lessini Durello
 Lison Pramaggiore
 Lugana
 Montgello e Colli Asolani
 Piave
 Prosecco
 Soave
 Valdadige
 Valpolicella

Latvia 
 Sabile

Lithuania 

 Anykščių vynas – Anykščiai
 Mėmelio vynas – Priekulė

Luxembourg 

 Moselle Valley

Moldova 

 Bardar
 Codri
 Cricova
 Hîncești
 Purcari

Montenegro 
 Crmnica
 Plantaže, near Podgorica

Netherlands 

 Groesbeek

North Macedonia 

 Povardarie
 Skopsko vinogorje
 Tikveš

Poland 

 Dolny Śląsk
 Kazimierz Dolny
 Małopolska
 Podkarpacie
 Warka, near Warsaw
 Zielona Góra

Portugal 

 Alentejo
 Bairrada
 Bucelas
 Carcavelos
 Colares
 Dão
 Lagoa
 Lagos
 Madeira
 Portimão
 Porto e Douro
 Setúbal
 Tavira
 Vinhos Verdes

Romania 

Banat wine regions:
 Arad
 Jamu Mare
 Măderat
 Miniș
 Moldova Nouă
 Recaș
 Silagiu
 Teremia
 Tirol

Crișana wine regions:
 Diosig
 Săcuieni
 Sâniob
 Sanislău
 Valea lui Mihai

Dobrogea wine regions:
 Adamclisi
 Aliman
 Babadag
 Băneasa
 Cernavodă
 Chirnogeni
 Dăeni
 Hârșova
 Istria
 Măcin
 Medgidia
 Murfatlar
 Oltina
 Ostrov, Constanța
 Ostrov, Tulcea
 Poarta Albă
 Sarica-Niculițel
 Simioc
 Tulcea
 Valea Dacilor
 Valea Nucarilor
 Valu lui Traian

Moldavia wine regions:
 Berești
 Bohotin
 Cotești
 Colinele Tutovei
 Comarna
 Copou
 Corod
 Cotnari
 Covurlui
 Cucuteni
 Dealu Morii
 Dealul Bujorului
 Hârlău
 Hlipicani
 Huși
 Iași
 Ivești
 Jariștea
 Nămoloasa
 Nicorești
 Odobești
 Panciu
 Păunești
 Probota
 Tănăsoaia
 Târgu Frumos
 Tecuci
 Țifești
 Tomești
 Vaslui
 Zeletin

Muntenia wine regions:
 Seciu
 Breaza
 Cricov
 Dealu Mare
 Dealurile Buzăului
 Pietroasa
 Râmnicu Sărat
 Șercaia
 Ștefănești
 Tohani
 Topoloveni
 Urlați–Ceptura
 Valea Călugărească
 Valea Mare
 Zărnești
 Zorești

Oltenia wine regions:
 Banu Mărăcine
 Calafat
 Cetate
 Corcova
 Dăbuleni
 Dealul Viilor
 Dealurile Craiovei
 Drăgășani
 Golul Drincei
 Greaca
 Iancu Jianu
 Izvoarele
 Orevița
 Plaiurile Drâncei
 Plenița
 Podgoria Dacilor
 Podgoria Severinului
 Poiana Mare
 Potelu
 Sadova-Corabia
 Sâmburești
 Segarcea
 Tâmburești
 Vânju Mare
 Zimnicea

Transylvania wine regions:
 Aiud
 Alba Iulia
 Bistrița
 Blaj
 Ighiu
 Jidvei
 Lechința
 Mediaș
 Șamșud
 Sebeș-Apold
 Șimleu Silvaniei
 Târnave
 Târnăveni
 Teaca
 Triteni
 Valea Nirajului

Russia 

 Caucasus
 Krasnodar
 Stavropol

San Marino

Serbia 

 Banat region

 Nišava – South Morava region
 Pocerina region
 Srem region
 Subotica – Horgoš region
 Šumadija – Great Morava region
 Timok Valley
 West Morava region

Slovakia 

 Malokarpatská (Small Carpathians)
 Južnoslovenská (Southern Slovakia)
 Nitrianska (region of Nitra)
 Stredoslovenská (Central Slovakia)
 Tokaj (Tokaj region of Slovakia)
 Východoslovenská (Eastern Slovakia)
 The whole of southern Slovakia

Slovenia 

 Podravje
 Posavje
 Primorska

Spain 

 Andalusia
 Condado de Huelva
 Jerez-Xeres-Sherry
 Málaga and Sierras de Málaga
 Manzanilla de Sanlúcar de Barrameda
 Montilla-Moriles
 Aragon
 Calatayud
 Campo de Borja
 Campo de Cariñena
 Cava
 Somontano
 Balearic Islands
 Binissalem-Mallorca
 Plà i Llevant (DO)
 Basque Country
 Alavan Txakoli
 Biscayan Txakoli
 Cava
 Getaria Txakoli
 Rioja (Alavesa)
 Canary Islands
 Abona
 El Hierro (DO)
 Gran Canaria (DO)
 La Gomera (DO)
 La Palma (DO)
 Lanzarote (DO)
 Tacoronte-Acentejo
 Valle de Güímar
 Valle de la Orotava
 Ycoden-Daute-Isora
 Castile and León
 Arlanza
 Arribes del Duero
 Bierzo
 Cava
 Cigales
 Espumosos de Castilla y León
 Ribera del Duero
 Rueda
 Tierra del Vino de Zamora
 Toro
 Valles de Benavente
 Tierra de León
 Valtiendas
 Vino de la Tierra Castilla y León
 Castile–La Mancha
 Almansa
 Dominio de Valdepusa
 Guijoso
 Jumilla
 La Mancha
 Manchuela
 Méntrida
 Mondéjar
 Ribera del Júcar
 Valdepeñas
 Catalonia
 Alella
 Catalunya
 Cava
 Conca de Barberà
 Costers del Segre
 Empordà
 Montsant
 Penedès
 Pla de Bages
 Priorat
 Tarragona
 Terra Alta
 Extremadura
 Cava
 Ribera del Guadiana
 Galicia
 Monterrey
 Rías Baixas
 Ribeira Sacra
 Ribeiro
 Valdeorras
 La Rioja
 Cava
 Rioja (DOCa)
 Community of Madrid
 Vinos de Madrid
 Región de Murcia
 Bullas
 Jumilla
 Yecla
 Navarre
 Cava
 Navarra
 Rioja
 Valencian Community
 Alicante
 Cava
 Utiel-Requena
 Valencia

Sweden 

 Gutevin – Gotland

Switzerland 

 Aargau
 Bern
 Shores of Lake Biel
 Shores of Lake Thun (Spiez / Oberhofen)
 Freiburg
 Geneva
 Grisons
 Neuchâtel
 St. Gallen
 Schaffhausen
 Thurgau
 Ticino
 Valais
 Vaud
 La Côte
 Lavaux
 Zürich

Ukraine 

In Ukraine, at the present time there are seven administrative regions (provinces) in which the wine industry has developed. Given the favorable climatic location,  the law of Ukraine allocated 15 winegrowing areas (macrozones), which are the basis for growing certain varieties of grapes, and 58 natural wine regions (microzones). These are located mainly in the following areas.

 Autonomous Republic of Crimea and Sevastopol – 6 macrozones with 12 microzones (69 wine grapes)
 Kherson Oblast – 2 macrozones with 10 microzones (28 wine grapes)
 Mykolaiv Oblast – 2 macrozones with 7 microzones (31 wine grapes)
 Odessa Oblast – 3 macrozones with 16 microzones (42 wine grapes)
 Zakarpattia Oblast – 1 macrozone with 12 microzones (24 wine grapes)
 Zaporizhzhia Oblast – 1 macrozone with 1 microzone (5 wine grapes)

United Kingdom 

In the UK, the area under vines is small, and whilst viticulture is not a major part of the rural economy, significant planting of new vines has occurred in the early 21st century. The greatest concentration of vineyards is found in the south east of England, in the counties of Hampshire, Kent, Surrey, and Sussex.

Asia

Armenia 

 Ararat Valley
 Areni, in the Vayots Dzor Province
 Ijevan, in the Tavush Province

Azerbaijan 

 Aghdam, Agdam District
 Baku, capital
 Ganja, Ganja-Basar zone in central Azerbaijan
 Madrasa village of Shamakhi Rayon, from Madrasa, indigenous only to this region
 Tovuz and Shamkir, northwestern Azerbaijan

Burma 
 Shan State

China 

Regions producing native wines have been present since the Qin Dynasty, with wines being brought to China from Persia. Some of the more famous wine-producing regions are:
 Chang'an
 Gaochang
 Luoyang
 Qiuci
 Yantai-Penglai

With the import of Western wine-making technologies, especially French technology, production of wines similar to modern French wine has begun in many parts of China with the direction of experienced French wine-makers; China is now the sixth largest producer of wine in the world. The following regions produce significant quality of wine:
 Chang'an
 Dalian, Liaoning
 Tonghua, Jilin
 Yantai, Shandong
 Yibin, Sichuan
 Zhangjiakou, Hebei

India 

 Nashik, Maharashtra
 Bangalore, Karnataka
 Vijayapura, Karnataka
 Narayangaon
 Pune, Maharashtra
 Sangli, Maharashtra

Indonesia 

Indonesia has been producing wine for over 18 years, with North Bali's vineyards producing three main grape varieties: the Belgia, the Alphonse Lavallee and the Probolinggo Biru.  The main producer, Hatten Wines, has revolutionized the world of winemaking, with eight wines produced from these three varieties.
 Bali

Iran 
Prior to the Iranian Islamic Revolution of 1979, Iran was a producer of wine. While production has stopped, the vineyards continue to exist and their product has been diverted to non-alcoholic purposes.
 Malayer
 Shiraz
 Takestan
 Urmia
 Qazvin
 Quchan

Israel 

Also includes wine regions in Israeli-occupied territories.
 Bet Shemesh
 Galilee
 Golan Heights
 Jerusalem
 Judean Hills
 Latrun
 Mount Carmel
 Rishon LeZion (wine production since 1886)

Japan 

 Yamanashi
 Hokkaido
 Nagano

Kazakhstan

South Korea 

 Anseong, Gyeonggi-do
 Gimcheon, Gyeongsangbuk-do
 Gyeongsan, Gyeongsangbuk-do
 Yeongcheon, Gyeongsangbuk-do
 Yeongdong, Chungcheongbuk-do

Lebanon 

 Bekaa Valley
 Anjar
 Chtoura
 Rashaya
 Zahlé
 Mount Lebanon
 Aley
 Baabda
 Beit Mery
 Bhamdoun
 Brummana
 Byblos
 Chouf
 Keserwan District
 North Governorate
 Chekka
 Ehden
 Koura
 Qadisha Valley
 Tripoli
 Zgharta
 South Governorate
 Jezzine
 Marjayoun
 Rmaich

Palestinian territories 
 Beit Jala
 Hebron

Syria 
 Bloudan
 Homs District
 Jabal el Druze
 Latakia
 Sednaya
 Syrian Golan
 Tartous

Turkey 

White wine grapes:
 Altıntaş – Marmara region and Bozcaada
 Beylerce – Bilecik area
 Bornova Misketi – İzmir area
 Emir – Nevşehir (Cappadocia) area
 Hasandede – Ankara and central Anatolia
 Narince – Tokat area
 Rumi, Kabarcık, Dökülgen – Southeastern Anatolia region
 Sultaniye – Aegean region
 Yapıncak – Thracian region
Red wine grapes
 Adakarası – Marmara region and Avşa Island
 Boğazkere – Elazığ and Diyarbakır areas
 Çalkarası – Çal, Denizli area
 Dimrit – central Anatolia and eastern Aegean region
 Horozkarası, Sergikarası – southeastern Anatolia region
 Kalecik Karası – Ankara area
 Karalahna – Tekirdağ region, Bozcaada 
 Karasakız, Kuntra – Çanakkale region
 Öküzgözü – Elazığ area
 Papazkarası – Kırklareli area

Vietnam 

 Da Lat

Oceania

Australia 

Geographic indications for Australian wine are governed by law. The geographic indication must indicate where the grapes are grown, irrespective of where the wine itself is made. A geographic indication may be "Australia", "South Eastern Australia", a state name, zone, region or subregion if defined.

The zones, regions and subregions in each state are listed below:

New South Wales 

 Big Rivers
 Murray Darling
 Perricoota
 Riverina
 Swan Hill
 Central Ranges
 Cowra
 Mudgee
 Orange
 Hunter Valley
 Hunter
 Broke Fordwich
 Pokolbin
 Upper Hunter Valley
 Northern Rivers
 Hastings River
 Northern Slopes
 New England Australia
 South Coast
 Shoalhaven Coast
 Southern Highlands
 Southern New South Wales
 Canberra District (includes the northern part of the Australian Capital Territory)
 Gundagai
 Hilltops
 Tumbarumba

Queensland 
 Granite Belt
 South Burnett

South Australia 

Adelaide Super Zone includes Mount Lofty Ranges, Fleurieu and Barossa wine zones.
 Barossa
 Barossa Valley
 Eden Valley
 High Eden
 Far North
 Southern Flinders Ranges
 Fleurieu
 Currency Creek
 Kangaroo Island
 Langhorne Creek
 McLaren Vale
 Southern Fleurieu
 Limestone Coast
 Coonawarra
 Mount Benson
 Mount Gambier
 Padthaway
 Robe
 Wrattonbully
 Lower Murray
 Riverland
 Mount Lofty Ranges
 Adelaide Hills
 Lenswood
 Piccadilly Valley
 Adelaide Plains
 Clare Valley
 The Peninsulas

Tasmania 

Regions, no zones defined
 Coal River
 Derwent Valley
 East Coast
 North West
 Pipers River
 Southern
 Tamar Valley

Victoria 

 Central Victoria
 Bendigo
 Goulburn Valley
 Nagambie Lakes
 Heathcote
 Strathbogie Ranges
 Upper Goulburn
 Gippsland
 North East Victoria
 Alpine Valleys
 Beechworth
 Glenrowan
 King Valley
 Rutherglen
 North West Victoria
 Murray Darling
 Swan Hill
 Port Phillip
 Geelong
 Macedon Ranges
 Mornington Peninsula
 Sunbury
 Yarra Valley
 Western Victoria
 Grampians
 Henty
 Pyrenees

Western Australia 

 Greater Perth
 Peel
 Perth Hills
 Swan Valley
 South Western Australia
 Blackwood Valley
 Geographe
 Great Southern
 Albany
 Denmark
 Frankland River
 Mount Barker
 Porongurup
 Manjimup
 Margaret River
 Pemberton

New Zealand 

GI stands for New Zealand Geographical Indication.

 Auckland (GI)
 Henderson
 Kumeu (GI)
 Matakana (GI)
 Waiheke Island (GI)
 Canterbury (GI)
 North Canterbury (GI)
 Waipara Valley (GI)
 Central Otago (GI)
 Bendigo
 Bannockburn (GI)
 Gibbston
 Wanaka
 Gisborne (GI)
 Hawke's Bay (GI)
 Central Hawke's Bay (GI)
 Gimblett Gravels
 Bridge Pa Triangle
 Marlborough (GI)
 Wairau Valley
 Southern Valleys
 Awatere Valley
 Nelson (GI)
 Northland (GI)
 Waikato (Te Kauwhata)
 Wairarapa (GI)
 Martinborough (GI)
 Gladstone (GI)
 Waitaki Valley (GI)

Notes

References 

 
Wine-producing regions